Meir Fund is an American Orthodox rabbi, Kabbalist, and spiritual leader of Congregation Sheves Achim, 1517 Avenue H, in Brooklyn, New York. He comes from a long line of rabbis in Europe and was close with both Rabbi Joseph Soloveitchik during his student days and with Rabbi Shlomo Carlebach.

In October 1977, on Succos, Rabbi Fund performed at a concert in the Gramercy Park Brotherhood Synagogue's succah that jointly benefited the Hopi Legal Fund, which defended Hopi lands in the West from being strip mined, and Moshav Me'or Modin, a communal settlement in Israel led by Rabbi Shlomo Carlbach. 

Since 1992, he has led Kabbalah classes in the Greenwich Village Synagogue. He also led Kabbalah classes at the 92nd Street Y. According to Fund, Kabbalah is analogous to an ocean.

References

American Orthodox rabbis
People from Brooklyn
Living people
Year of birth missing (living people)